The Message Trust is a Christian charity working to improve the lives of people in the UK and beyond through work in schools, prisons and communities.

Working in partnership with churches and other organisations, The Message is in contact with around 100,000 young people each year.

The Message was founded by Andy Hawthorne OBE.

In 2018, The Message was named the Best Not-For-Profit To Work For in the Sunday Times' annual Best Companies survey.

History
The history of The Message is told in Andy Hawthorne's books, The Message 20 - Celebrating Two Decades of Changed Lives  and Diary of a Dangerous Vision 

The Message Trust has its roots in a week-long youth event that took place at the Manchester Apollo in 1988, Message '88. 
Founder and current CEO Andy Hawthorne together with his businessman brother Simon felt stirred to present the Christian gospel message relevantly to the young people of Manchester and organised a week of mission gigs at the Apollo. Message ‘88 attracted over 20,000 young people to hear live performances by bands and artists and a presentation of the gospel message.

A repeat run in 1989 attracted similar numbers and led to the brothers being approached by a member of one of the bands involved about forming a full-time youth mission to schools. ‘Message to Schools’ was the result, formed with the express purpose of taking the gospel to young people in schools through hip hop and dance music.

As the team continued to develop a sharper focus on Manchester, particularly the toughest areas and estates, the charity expanded their initiatives from just schools work, changing its name to what we know it as today, The Message Trust. 

In more recent years, The Message has expanded into other parts of the UK, and across the world, with Advance Groups meeting in 91 nations across the globe.

World Wide Message Tribe & Creative Teams 
The Message has a history of engaging young people with a message of hope through creative mission, including the development of popular music. The World Wide Message Tribe, later shortened to simply The Tribe, was initially formed to run the schools weeks. Demand for the band to play in schools and further afield quickly increased and the Tribe went on to record successful albums which brought international recognition and critical acclaim.
The Tribe disbanded in 2004, but The Message's schools work has multiplied with new creative teams to reach young people in high schools in Greater Manchester and beyond. 

These have included bands LZ7, Twelve24, Vital Signs, MaLoKai, BrightLine, KineticIV, SoulBox, Amongst Wolves and OTC; theatre company In Yer Face; dance crew Square1; sex and relationships team Respect ME and disability engagement team Enable.

Eden 
As the team developed a sharper focus on Manchester, and particularly the toughest areas and estates of the city, Andy Hawthorne and team began to have a vision to see Christians moving into these areas to live and work, supporting local churches particularly to reach young people. This initiative was named Eden, and the first Eden partnership was launched in 1997 in Benchill, Wythenshawe, at that time the most deprived neighbourhood in the UK. Others followed and over the last 30 years, they have planted more than 70 Eden teams, with 700 volunteers, in key areas of urban challenge in Greater Manchester and across the UK. The history and philosophy behind Eden is explained in Matt Wilson's books Eden: Called to the Streets and Concrete Faith. In 2009, the Eden Network  was formed with the aim of spreading the Eden vision to other urban areas across the UK, and 2014 saw the first Eden team outside the UK in Cape Town, South Africa. Eden launched in the neighbourhood of Downtown Eastside, Greater Vancouver, Canada in 2018.

Message Bus
A bus ministry was launched in early 2000, to extend The Message's reach into local communities. The Message Buses (formerly Eden Buses) are cutting edge mobile youth centres, equipped with technology and staffed by volunteers from local churches. Each week the 6 buses visit deprived neighbourhoods in the North West, London, South Wales, Midlands, and Yorkshire and Humber, working with hundreds of young people each week.

Festivals & Tours

Message 2000 
In the summer of 2000, The Message partnered with another Christian youth charity, Soul Survivor, to run an ambitious citywide youth mission, Message 2000.
Around 10,000 young Christian volunteers worked in partnership with Greater Manchester churches on social, environmental and crime reduction projects. 
The project was hailed as a success, not least because during the 10 days of work in one estate, Swinton Valley, there were no recorded incidence of crime. Since the summer of 2000, police have reported a sustained reduction in crime.

Festival:Manchester 
In the summer of 2003, The Message partnered with the Luis Palau Evangelistic Association, to put on another week-long citywide venture, Festival:Manchester.
Over 5,000 young people got involved in a total of 317 local community projects, many in association with the Greater Manchester Police.
Around 55,000 people from across Manchester attended the open-air festival that took place in Heaton Park the following weekend, featuring Luis Palau, and performances from The Tribe, Michael Tait and TobyMac.

The Higher Tour 
In 2015, The Message announced plans for the Higher Tour, a UK-wide mission to share the gospel with young people in schools and arenas. In partnership with LZ7, Twelve24 and Chip Kendall, the tour was first delivered in Greater Manchester in 2016, reaching 35,000 young people in 55 schools over three weeks. Since then, Higher has visited the Midlands, Cambridgeshire, the Channel Islands and South Wales. As the UK went into lockdown, the Higher Tour went online and the team delivered lessons and entertaining content through YouTube and social media.

Festival Manchester 

In 2022, a second free event, Festival Manchester took place in Wythenshawe Park  over three days in July 2022. Alongside gaming tents, skatepark and fairground, the live stage featured Grammy-award winning artists such as Matt Redman, Lecrae and 2x Platinum artist, Goodboys.

No More Knives Tour 
As a response to the increased number of knife-related incidents in the UK, The Message started a school tour encouraging young people to lay down their knives. These lessons, supported by the police, teach young people not to carry knives. Alongside the tour, The Message band OTC, released the song 'Lay Your Knives Down' which is performed as part of this tour, and at the end-of-tour gigs.

'Words and action' evangelism 
The model of ‘words and action’ evangelism which characterised both Message 2000 and Festival:Manchester continued in the ‘Big Deal’, ‘Hope 08’ and 'Shine Your Light' initiatives. Supported by police, schools and councillors, Big Deal and Hope 08 brought together local communities to deliver social action and community-building projects in the ten boroughs that make up Greater Manchester. These range from environmental clean-ups, painting, car washes, barbecues, children's activities, fun days and youth concerts. In 2010, The Message launched a national campaign to spread the model of 'words and action' evangelism further, challenging young people to complete 15 specific acts of kindness in their local communities during the summer of 2010.

Ministry in prisons 
The Message was a founder member of the Reflex network in partnership with Youth For Christ, delivering ministry in prisons across the North West of England. Outreach workers engage mainly with young offenders between the ages of 18 and 21 but also with juvenile offenders aged 17 and under.
Their work spans first-contact detached work on the prison wings through to help with resettlement back into the community in conjunction with the Message Community Hub (see below).

Message School 
The Message School of Evangelism (formerly Genetik/Message Academy) is an annual gap-year programme for young people aged 17 and over who wish to train in Christian mission and youth work. Nearly 500 young leaders were trained by The Message between 2001 and 2018. The Message Academy course runs over 10 months and involves placements in The Message's community-based Eden projects. Students choose from three specialist 'tracks' – Creative, Urban or Worship – which have attracted guest tutors including Matt Redman.

Message Enterprise 
In January 2013, the charity opened the Message Community Hub (Formerly Message Enterprise Centre), a new business and training hub for young people in the region. Building on The Message's track record for mentoring young men and women from disadvantaged communities and those leaving custody, the centre has created several new businesses which employ ex-offenders. As of February 2019, these include a café, a property maintenance and development business, and events businesses.

Advance 
In 2017 The Message was a founding partner of Advance 2020 along with the Church of England, Evangelical Alliance, Hope, Luis Palau Association and Redeemed Christian Church of God (RCCG). Advance 2020 describes itself as ‘building towards a huge year of outreach throughout the UK in 2020’ and is additionally partnered with Church Army, Counties UK, Christian Vision for Men, Light, the Pais Movement, Fusion, Youth For Christ, EdgeFest, Kick London, The4Points, the Boys' Brigade, Stewardship, Activate Your Life and Elim Pentecostal Church.

Regional and international hubs
During 2014, two UK hubs were launched to develop The Message's reach across the nation of Scotland and the Midlands region. In September 2015 Message Wales was launched when Ignite merged with the Message Trust. Gary Smith, founder of Ignite was appointed Message Wales Director. Since then, The Message have established additional UK hub locations with offices in London, Yorkshire, the North East and the Midlands.

The Message South Africa launched in March 2014, first in Cape Town and then across South Africa. In 2016, The Message Canada was launched in Vancouver, Canada, followed by The Message Germany in Annaberg-Buchholz in 2017.

Regional UK Hubs 

 London 
 Midlands 
 Yorkshire
 North East
 North West

International Hub 

 South Africa
 Canada
 Germany
 Brazil (June 2023)

Awards

Urban Hero Awards
July 2008 saw the first annual Urban Hero Awards at which young people are honoured for notable achievements, often against the odds. The Awards have been repeated each year since, with winners from all over England emerging from Eden work in Yorkshire to the Message School of Evangelism programme in Manchester. The Urban Hero Awards 2018 took place at Lancashire County Cricket Club's Old Trafford ground with 800 guests.

See also
Galactus Jack

References

External links
The Message official website
The Message Enterprise Centre official website
The Higher Tour official website
Advance2020 official website

Charities based in Manchester
Christianity in England
Christian conferences
Christian charities based in the United Kingdom
Christian parachurch organizations
Religion in Manchester
Christian organizations established in 1992
Wythenshawe